Line 18 is a north–south Shanghai Metro line running from  station in the city's Baoshan District to Hangtou station in Pudong, with a length of . The line was originally scheduled to open by the end of 2020. However, officials announced that only the initial segment of eight stations in Pudong started test runs in September 2020. The  southern section opened for passenger operations on December 26, 2020. The remainder of the line was opened on 30 December 2021. The line is one of Shanghai Metro's new batch of high capacity fully automated and driverless lines along with Lines 14 and 15. The line is colored medium light shade of brown on system maps.

History 
The line began construction on 12 May 2016. An eight-station segment in Pudong, running from  station in the north to  station in the south, underwent testing in September 2020 and opened on 26 December 2020. This initial segment connects to line 11 at Yuqiao station.

Controversy 
During the planning of Line 18, large amounts of controversy was generated among local residents when the initial alignment of the southern section of Line 18 was shifted from Kangshen Road westwards  to follow the S122 Hunan Highway instead. The new alignment, instead of directly serving the densely populated Kangshen Road axis of Zhoupu town, now merely serves the western edge of Zhoupu. Planners received uncharacteristically large volume of feedback on the decision, with 300 calls and 3000 e-mails received pertaining to the change in alignment. Industry insiders have noted that the change in alignment was a compromise between local and regional transport demands. In addition, they noted the increased difficulty and cost of constructing a subway under the narrow Kangshen Road and that there is more land open to new development along the wider Hunan Highway.

Stations

Service routes

Important stations
  - Interchange with Line 11.
Longyang Road - Interchange with Lines 2, 7, and 16 in addition to (out of system transfer with) Maglev.
Jiangpu Road - Interchange with Line 8 located beside Xinhua Hospital.
Fudan University - The station is located within the confines of Fudan University.

Future expansion

Phase 2

The second phase of line 18 has undergone a planning change, adding a station at West Changjiang Road, going into a large heavy industrial zone, intersecting Line 1 at Hulan Road station instead of Tonghe Xincun and ending at Dakang Road instead of Kangding Road. Proposals to extend the line further west to Line 7 are under consideration.

Headways 
<onlyinclude>

Technology

Signalling

Rolling Stock 
The trains will be the first Shanghai Metro trains to offer wireless and USB phone charging. Trains have a capacity of about 1,860 people.

References

Shanghai Metro lines
Railway lines opened in 2020
 
2020 establishments in China
1500 V DC railway electrification